Ricardo Kennedy (1867–1938) was an Argentine notary and politician who served as provincial legislator, and as Municipal Commissioner of the town of Rivadavia, province of Buenos Aires.

Biography 

Kennedy was born in Buenos Aires, the son of Alexander Kennedy, born in Ireland, and Anna Kennedy, born in the city. He was the president of the College of Notaries of the Province in 1910, and served as a government notary between 1909 and 1938.

He was married to Josefa Monasterio, daughter of Martín Monasterio and Josefa Vieyra. His son, Martín Kennedy was married to Celia Amoedo, daughter of Joaquín Amoedo, grandson of Sinforoso Amoedo, and Lía Giráldez, belonging to a distinguished family.

References 

1867 births
1938 deaths
Lawyers from Buenos Aires
Argentine people of Irish descent
Argentine people of Spanish descent
Argentine politicians
19th-century Argentine lawyers
20th-century Argentine lawyers
Argentine notaries